The Keith Islands are a Canadian Arctic island group in the Nunavut Territory. The islands lie in Queen Maud Gulf, north of Nunavut mainland's Ogden Bay, between Bowes Point and Armark.

References 

Uninhabited islands of Kitikmeot Region